The Battle of Vinjesvingen was a battle of the Norwegian campaign and took place in May 1940 in the Telemark county, Norway. It became one of the two last strongholds of Norwegian resistance in southern Norway during World War II, the other being Hegra Fortress.

Background
Under the command of Second Lieutenant Thor O. Hannevig, the Norwegians held their position against superior German forces until 5 May 1940. Hannevig managed to sneak great loads of arms, equipment and fuel from depots right in front of the German forces. The equipment was brought to Vinje and Vågsli in Telemark, where Hannevig established a unit which came to be known as Telemark Infantry Regiment. This included Krag–Jørgensen bolt action rifles, Madsen light machine guns, Colt M/29 heavy machine guns,  mortars as well as mines and explosives to destroy bridges and roads. The plan was to prevent German advance westward through Telemark and Setesdal, and to support Allied reinforcements from the west.

Battle
A full mobilization was carried out in the area, and at most the force totaled around 300 men, but the number changed constantly. Several small battles were fought, mostly involving Norwegian ambushes on advancing German formations, using small arms and IEDs. The Norwegian defenders often destroyed and/or damaged bridges and roads in the area to delay the German advance.

The main battle took place from 3–5 May. Large German forces were eventually deployed to the area, and the German losses were considerable. When it was realized that the entire south of Norway was lost, and that the Allied Åndalsnes task force would not break through from the west, Hannevig initiated negotiations for surrender. The battles of Vinjesvingen had a great symbolic effect during the occupation, and provided a moral boost to a rather depressing occupation. It was however not known to the rest of the country while the battles were fought.

See also 

 List of Norwegian military equipment of World War II
 List of German military equipment of World War II

References
 

Vinjesvingen
Vinjesvingen
Norwegian campaign
1940 in Norway
History of Telemark
Vinje
May 1940 events